Acrogenotheca elegans is a fungus species in the genus Acrogenotheca described originally from Australia and found very commonly in New Zealand.

References

External links 

 
 Acrogenotheca elegans at mycobank.org (retrieved 0 April 2016)

Capnodiaceae
Fungi described in 1963
Fungi of Australia
Fungi of New Zealand